Optical manufacturing and testing spans an enormous range of manufacturing procedures and optical test configurations. 

The manufacture of a conventional spherical lens typically begins with the generation of the optic's rough shape by grinding a glass blank. This can be done, for example, with ring tools. Next, the lens surface is polished to its final form. Typically this is done by lapping—rotating and rubbing the rough lens surface against a tool with the desired surface shape, with a mixture of abrasives and fluid in between. 
Typically a carved pitch tool is used to polish the surface of a lens.  The mixture of abrasive is called slurry and it is typically made from cerium or zirconium oxide in water with lubricants added to facilitate pitch tool movement without sticking to the lens. The particle size in the slurry is adjusted to get the desired shape and finish.  

During polishing, the lens may be tested to confirm that the desired shape is being produced, and to ensure that the final shape has the correct form to within the allowed precision. The deviation of an optical surface from the correct shape is typically expressed in fractions of a wavelength, for some convenient wavelength of light (perhaps the wavelength at which the lens is to be used, or a visible wavelength for which a source is available). Inexpensive lenses may have deviations of form as large as several wavelengths (λ, 2λ, etc.). More typical industrial lenses would have deviations no larger than a quarter wavelength (λ/4). Precision lenses for use in applications such as lasers, interferometers, and holography have surfaces with a tenth of a wavelength (λ/10) tolerance or better. In addition to surface profile, a lens must meet requirements for surface quality (scratches, pits, specks, etc.) and accuracy of dimensions.

Fabrication techniques

Glass blank manufacturing
 Batch mixing
 Casting techniques
 Annealing schedules and equipment
 Physical characterization techniques
 Index of refraction measurements and calculation of melt pedigree
Diamond shaping techniques
 Diamond wheel curve generation processes and equipment
 Diamond edging processes and equipment
Loose grit fabrication techniques:
 Rough grinding
 Fine grinding
 Polishing and figuring
Single-point diamond turning processes and equipment
Glass moulding techniques
 Precision glass moulding

Testing techniques
 Direct surface profile measurement
 Direct surface surveying (no intervening optics, for example Foucault knife-edge test, Ronchi test, Caustic test)
 Auxiliary optics (null correctors, computer-generated holograms, etc.)
 Interferometric testing

See also
Optical lens design
Vapor polishing

Notes and references 

Malacara, D., Optical Shop Testing - 2nd Edition, John Wiley and Sons, 1992,

External links 
 Virtual Lens Plant, Canon Camera Museum Instructional videos of the processes, within a flash web interface.

Optics
Optical components, fabrication
Glass engineering and science